Saint-Germain Castle is a castle in the municipality of Gruyères of the Canton of Fribourg in Switzerland. It is a Swiss heritage site of national significance.

In 1998 Swiss surrealist painter, sculptor and set designer H. R. Giger acquired the castle, and it now houses the H. R. Giger Museum, a permanent repository of his work. His wife, Carmen Maria Scheifele Giger, is the Director of the H.R. Giger Museum.

See also
 List of castles in Switzerland
 Château
 HR Giger

References

Cultural property of national significance in the canton of Fribourg
Gruyères
Castles in the canton of Fribourg